Lawaan, officially the Municipality of Lawaan, is a 5th class municipality in the province of Eastern Samar, Philippines. According to the 2020 census, it has a population of 13,003 people. It is home to Bolusao Watershed Forest Reserve, primarily located in Barangay Bolusao.

Lawaan is the historical hometown of the legendary sundang-wielding fighters in women's clothing during the 1901 Battle of Balangiga. Being a town adjacent to the Samar Island Natural Park - the country's largest terrestrial protected area - the land is blessed with vast natural landscapes and wild life sanctuaries. Numerous waterfalls such as Amandaraga, Amanjuray, Pangi and Ban-awan dot the vast Bolusao Watershed Forest Reserve. Off the coast, white-sand islets also abound the town's horizon.

History 
An enterprising young couple by the names of Juan (Guingot) Gabrillo and his wife Etifania Halbay, together with their children, set sail one day in a small sailboat from Guiuan, in search of a greener pasture of an ideal place to settle. On their westward journey along the wooded coastline of Southern Samar, they reached a small island known as “Monbon” which was bordering the mouth of what is now the Lawa-an river. It was just in time to see that a severe storm was brewing from the western horizon. They decided to move inland, hastening towards the coastal jungle in their immediate front, to seek shelter behind the trunk of a towering tree which was clearly visible from the sea. It was behind that great tree that the frantic family was divinely protected from the roaring fury of the storm and a dire calamity was happily averted. When the typhoon subsided the next day the couple noticed that another tree of the same height and stature was also growing on the opposite bank of the river, twin sister to that of the other side - both so majestic and impressive in appearance, such that the branches up above completely overshadowed the river in-between.

After a hasty and meager breakfast of hot porridge, the small family looked askance of their surroundings and was deeply impressed by their new environment. The jungle growth even along the seashore bespoke fertility of the soil; the abundance of rattan and “hagnaya” vines was easy source of income and the shallow sea beside them was teeming with marine life of all kinds. All these offered suggestions that the place was ideal haven for habitation. So they abandoned their journey westward, instead, started building a makeshift hut at the foot of the same Lawa-an tree where they took refuge, at the same time, collecting whatever few belongings they could salvage from the wreckage of their boat. The days and weeks that followed were a series of trips inland by Juan Guingot - to cut rattan and hagnaya vines hereabouts or, perchance, he might find some edible fruits or root-crops nearby. Still further, he found unmistakable signs that the area was infested with wild life. The presence of these predators posed quite a problem to his intended plan of growing a vegetable farm; nevertheless, Guingot presently started his clearing (caingin) and the making of traps to capture some wild hogs or monkeys for food.

As was predictable in situations like this, Guingot reconstructed his sailboat, loaded it with rattan and hagnaya vines and sailed back to Guiuan where he sold his cargoes, telling the people and his friends along the way how he, with his family, was overtaken by a dreadful storm and escaped disaster behind the trunk of a giant Lawa-an tree. He emphasized to them the bright prospect of settling in the area partly as a token of gratitude and reverence to that haven of refuge - the enormous trunks of the twin Lawa-an trees; but most importantly, that the surrounding area was abundant and ideal for habitation. “Mamatay lak О-toy”, Juan Guingot would excitedly employ the slang and flavor of the Guiuan vernacular, “mamatay lak, dadi okoy ha Lawa-an (naming the place Lawa-an for the first time), ayaw pag-alang. Di ka mawawara hit doro-ongan kay kita gud iton hita-as nga kahoy ha dagat.” (Boy, when I die, stay here in Lawa-an, don't hesitate. You will never get lost of the loading dock because the tall trees can be seen from the sea.) Indeed, there was no other point of reference more appealing to the settlers this outstanding landmark conspicuous from the sea.

That was how the present town of Lawa-an at first received its name. Ironically, five wide centuries have come and gone; people have lived and died along with generations in accordance with the short span of human life, but the name “LAWA-AN”, a former barrio of Balangiga, province of Eastern Samar, has remained, to this day, unchanged.

Geography 
The town is strategically located in the central part of southern Samar Island. It is sandwiched between the town of Balangiga in the east and Marabut, Samar in the west. Barangay Bolusao, the town's largest settlement located right at the east–west Samar boundary, serves as the premier barangay of Eastern Samar for those people coming from Tacloban City or Province of Samar traversing Samar Circumferencial Road. Hence, being dubbed as 'The Gateway to Eastern Samar'.

Barangays
Lawaan is politically subdivided into 16 barangays.

Climate

Demographics

Economy

Lawaan's main product is copra. Many families rely on coastal and deep-sea fishing as well as lowland and upland farming as means of livelihood.  Others have spouses, children, parents or other relatives working in Tacloban City, Metro Manila or in other places within the Philippines or abroad either as professionals, contract workers or domestic helpers who regularly remit part of their earnings to their families back home.  The single biggest employer of its local populace is the government.

Tourism
Lawaan is known for its waterfalls and wildlife. Being a coastal town, it overlooks Leyte Gulf in its southern shores.

There are four waterfalls in the Bolusao watershed which lies within the SINP Buffer Zone. These falls are Amandaraga, Pange, Amanjuray, and Ban-Awan Falls. Amandaraga and Ban-awan Falls are the main source of the municipality's water system. Meanwhile, Amanjuray Falls is the alternate hydro-electric power source of Lawaan wherein a mini-hydro power plant is existent nearby.

Notable personalities

 Freddie Abuda - retired professional basketball player, currently serving as an assistant coach to the San Beda Red Lions (NCAA).

References

External links
 [ Philippine Standard Geographic Code]
 Philippine Census Information
 Local Governance Performance Management System

Municipalities of Eastern Samar